Trapped in Silence  is a 1986 American made-for-television drama film starring Kiefer Sutherland and Marsha Mason, produced by Dick Atkins and Jeff Grant for Reader's Digest Entertainment Inc. It is based on the book Murphy's Boy (Silent Boy)  by Torey Hayden.

Plot 
The film is about a psychologist (Marsha Mason) who works with a traumatized boy (Kiefer Sutherland) with selective mutism - the patient cannot speak in specific situations or to specific people. Eventually the boy starts to open up to reveal his sordid story.

Cast 
 Marsha Mason as Jennifer Hubbell
 Kiefer Sutherland as Kevin Richter
 Ron Silver as Doctor Jeff Tomlinson
 John Mahoney as Doctor Winslow
 Rebecca Schull as Marlys Mengies

References

Bibliography

External links 

1986 films
Films directed by Michael Tuchner